Lalgola Assembly constituency is an assembly constituency in Murshidabad district in the Indian state of West Bengal.

Overview
As per orders of the Delimitation Commission, No. 61 Lalgola Assembly constituency covers Airmari Krishnapur, Bahadurpur, Bilbora Kopra, Dewansarai, Jasaitala, Kalmegha, Lalgola, Manikchak, Nashipur, Paikpara and Ramchandrapur gram panchayats of Lalgola community development block and  Kantanagar gram panchayat of Bhagabangola I community development block.

Lalgola Assembly constituency is part of No. 9 Jangipur (Lok Sabha constituency).
It Was Earlier Part of Murshidabad (Lok Sabha constituency) till 2009.

Members of Legislative Assembly

Election results

2011
In the 2011 election, Abu Hena of Congress defeated his nearest rival Yean Ali of CPI(M).

 

.# Swing calculated on Congress+Trinamool Congress vote percentages taken together in 2006.

1977–2006
In the 1991, 1996, 2001, and 2006 state assembly elections, Abu Hena of Congress won the Lalgola assembly seat defeating his nearest rival Jannat Unnesa Begam of CPI(M) in 2006 and Md. Johaque Ali of CPI(M) in 2001, 1996 and 1991. Contests in most years were multi cornered.
Abdus Sattar of Congress defeated Yean Ali of CPI(M) in 1987 and 1982, and Zainal Abedin of CPI(M) in 1977.

1951–1972
Abdus Sattar of Congress won in 1972, 1971, 1969 and 1967. Syed Kazim Ali Mirza of Congress won in 1962, 1957 and 1951.

References

Assembly constituencies of West Bengal
Politics of Murshidabad district